Maungaraki is a suburb of Lower Hutt. It is one of several Lower Hutt suburbs on the western hills of the Hutt Valley. It contains the largest suburban development on the Hutt Valley's western escarpment that runs along the Wellington Fault.

Maungaraki translated from Māori means "northern mountain". This may reference the Māori pā to the south that once stood at Pito-one.

Features of the suburb
The suburb has a shopping centre, a baptist church, and a community hall that is managed by the Maungaraki Community Association. The Church building was relocated from the old NZ Railways works at Moera.

There is one school in the suburb: Maungaraki School, a full primary school on Dowse Drive formed in 1999 by the merger of Puketiro and Otonga schools. Maungaraki also has a kindergarten and playcentre. 

Much of Maungaraki falls within Belmont Regional Park, and there are walking tracks from the suburb into the park. Korokoro Dam and its waterfall are both within the park and within Maungaraki.

History

Housing increased rapidly in the area during the 1960s, at the time it was the largest local-government subdivision in New Zealand.

The main road through the suburb, Dowse Drive, honours the Lower Hutt Mayor Percy Dowse (in office: 1950-1970), who led the development of housing in Maungaraki. Most of the other roads in the suburb feature the names of trees. Reese Jones Grove is named after Thomas and Myrtle Reese Jones, a Korokoro farming couple who sold a proportion of their land in Maungaraki to the Lower Hutt City Council in 1957.

Puketiro School opened in 1967 and was situated where Maungaraki School is now. Otonga School opened in 1977 and most of the land which Otonga School occupied is now private housing.

Demographics

2018 census data 
As of the 2018 New Zealand census, the suburb had a sex ratio of 0.98 males per female, and the median age was 37.4 years (compared with 37.4 years nationally). Ethnicities were 74.2% European/Pākehā, 10.2% Māori, 4.3% Pacific peoples, 20.6% Asian, and 2.8% other ethnicities (totals add to more than 100% since people could identify with multiple ethnicities). The proportion of people born overseas was 29.6%, compared with 27.1% nationally. Although some people objected to giving their religion, 50.5% had no religion, 34.1% were Christian, 5.6% were Hindu, 0.9% were Muslim, 1.4% were Buddhist and 2.8% had other religions. 

Of those at least 15 years old, 1,110 (35.5%) people had a bachelor or higher degree, and 312 (10.0%) people had no formal qualifications. The median income was $46,200, compared with $31,800 nationally. The employment status of those at least 15 was that 1,866 (59.6%) people were employed full-time, 414 (13.2%) were part-time, and 87 (2.8%) were unemployed.

Education

External links
Maungaraki School website
Maungaraki Community Association website

References

Suburbs of Lower Hutt